Slavonski bećari were a Croatian tamburitza ensemble founded in 1971 by tamburitza player and rock musician Antun Nikolić Tuca. The ensemble continued until 2011.

History 

In  1971 from The Big Tamburitza Orchestra of Radio Osijek Antun Nikolić Tuca forms tamburitza band Slavonski bećari, active until 2011. During their forty-year existence they gave many performances, traveled around the world (16 times United States and Canada, 2 times Australia, most European countries). Slavonski Bećari published 4 single and 11 long-play studio albums, 7 compilations, 35 festival records, 532 in HUZIP recorded television performances. They cooperated with many singers from Croatia and other countries, including Miroslav Škoro and Krunoslav Kićo Slabinac, and earned many international and national rewards and prizes.

Discography

Albums 
 1973. Krunoslav Kićo Slabinac and Slavonski bećari – Bećarac (arranger A. Nikolić) 
 1974. Krunoslav Kićo Slabinac and  Slavonski bećari – Kad čujem tambure / Lijepa moja Slavonija (arranger A. Nikolić) 
 1975. Krunoslav Kićo Slabinac, Slavonski bećari and Radio Osijek's Tamburitza Orchestra – Hej, bećari (conductor and arranger A. Nikolić) 
 1979. Krunoslav Kićo Slabinac – Seoska sam lola (arranger A. Nikolić, K. Slabinac) 
 1984. Krunoslav Kićo Slabinac and tamburitza ensemble Slavonski bećari under leadership of Antun Nikolić Tuca – Svatovac / Svi se momci oženiše (arrangers P. Nikolin i A. Nikolić) 
 1982. Ensemble Slavonski Bećari – Hrvatske Božićne pjesme (arranger A. Nikolić) 
 1983. Slavonski bećari and Mirjana Primorac – Ljubila sam crno oko (arranger and music producer A. Nikolić) 
 1985. Fabijan Šovagović and Slavonski Bećari - Pokraj Karašice (music editor and arranger A. Nikolić) 
 Šima Jovanovac and Slavonski Bećari – Stari Graničari / Pjevat će Slavonija (arranger A. Nikolić) 
 1986. Slavonski bećari - Zaplešimo uz tambure (music producer and arranger A. Nikolić) 
 1988. Slavonski bećari, Mirjana Primorac, Miroslav Škoro and Zdenko Nikšić (arranger A. Nikolić)  
 1992. Ensemble Antuna Nikolića Tuce Slavonski Bećari – Neće snaša tamburaša (music producer and arranger A. Nikolić) 
 1995. Ensemble Antuna Nikolića Tuce Slavonski Bećari (arranger and author of some songs  A. Nikolić) 
 1998. Slavonski bećari – Baš je bila luda godina (arranger and author of some songs A. Nikolić) 
 2003. Slavonski bećari - Narodne Božićne pjesme (arranger A. Nikolić)

Compilations 
 Tamburaški spomenar - 120 original hits; diverse performers (Crne oči dobro vide, Razigrana Šokadija, Snaša, Ej, tamburo, Tebi sam dala sve, Preko Drave skela vozi, Najlipše su cure u Daražu) 
 Sretan Božić - 120 original hits; diverse performers (Veselje ti navješćujem) 
 Šokačke pisme; diverse performers (Bećarina) 
 Zlatna kolekcija - Božić dolazi; diverse performers (Oj, djetešce moje drago) 
 Pjevat će Slavonija; diverse performers (Slavonijo) 
 Ej, tamburo - sve najbolje 2; diverse performers (Kad čujem tambure) 
 Najljepše Božićne pjesme; diverse performers (Tri kralja)

Festivals

"Brodfest" 
 1994. – "Za tebe pjevam" 
 1995. - "Pjevaj mi pjevaj, sokole" 
 1996. – "Hrvati će Baranju imati" 
 1997. - "Vukovaru, srećo, dobar dan" 
 1998. – "Sveta Kata, snig za vrata" 
 1999. – "Kućo moja na pol' šora" 
 2000. – "Najlipše su cure u Daražu" 
 2001. – "Dođi, diko, na šokačko sijelo" 
 2003. – "Vatra ivanjska" 
 2004. – "Lovačka himna" 
 2005. – "Ej, ravnico, moja mati"     
 2007. – "Oj, djetešce moje drago"

"Zlatne žice Slavonije" Požega 

 1992.  - "Rastaju se stari tamburaši" 
 1992. - "Snaša" 
 1993. - "Razigrana Šokadija" 
 1994. - "Znam da nisam neki pjesnik" 
 1995. - "Kad bi bila istina" 
 1996. – "Kapo moja poderana" 
 1997. – "Otac mi je stari tamburaš" 
 1998. – "Pokid'o sam na biciklu žbice" 
 2001. – "Da se meni još jedanput roditi" 
 2005. – "Nikad nismo bolje pili"

"Pjesme Podravine i Podravlja" Pitomača 
 1995. - "Gospa od Aljmaša" 
 1995. - "Podravski zet" 
 1998. – "Prve ljubavi" 
 1999. – "Kuca srce Slavonije" 
 2000. – "Samo pjevaj" 
 2001. – "Bećarska krv" 
 2002. – "Baranjska rujna zoro" 
 2004. – "Pala Drava Dunavu u zagrljaj" 
 2005. – "Zavirih ja u tvoje srdašce" 
 2007. – "Bećarski život" 
 2009. – "Teci, Dravo" 
 2011. - "Preko Drave skela vozi"

"Bonofest" 
 2009. - "Sveti Antune"

List of published songs

References

External links 
 "Vukovaru, srećo, dobar dan" Slavonski bećari and Marta Nikolin, official music video
 "Sveta Kata bit će snig za vrata", official music video
 "Kad čujem tambure", live television performance
 "Ej tamburo", live television performance

Croatian musical groups
Croatian folk musicians
Musical groups established in 1971
Musical groups disestablished in 2011